Michael Calnan is a former Irish Labour Party politician from County Cork. He was a senator from 1993 to 1997.

A teacher and former vice principal of the Maria Immaculata Secondary school in Dunmanway and long-serving member of Cork County Council for the Skibbereen electoral area – he was chairman of the council from 1988 to 1989 and 1992 to 1993 – he stepped down at the 1999 local elections. He attended University College Cork where he obtained a B.A, H.dip Ed, and a master's degree.

Calnan stood unsuccessfully as a candidate for Dáil Éireann in the Cork South-West constituency on three occasions, at the February 1982, 1992, and 1997 general elections. After his 1992 defeat, he stood in the 1993 elections to the 20th Seanad, winning a seat on the Agricultural Panel. He did not contest the 1997 Seanad elections.

References

Year of birth missing (living people)
Living people
Labour Party (Ireland) senators
Members of the 20th Seanad
Local councillors in County Cork
People from Dunmanway
Alumni of University College Cork